Manhattan Beach is a city in southwestern Los Angeles County, California, United States, on the Pacific coast south of El Segundo, west of Hawthorne and Redondo Beach, and north of Hermosa Beach. As of the 2010 census, the population was 35,135.

Manhattan Beach is one of the three Beach Cities, along with Hermosa Beach and Redondo Beach within the South Bay region of Los Angeles County.

History

The sandy coastal area was likely inhabited by the Tongva tribe of Native Americans. Archeological work in the nearby Chowigna excavation show evidence of inhabitants as far back as 7,100 years ago. The Tongva Village of Ongovanga was located near neighbouring Redondo Beach. It has been mentioned at the Historical Society that the location of a portion of current day Manhattan Beach may have been used as a Native American burial grounds.

In the mid-18th century, the Portolá expedition was the first European land exploration of present-day California. It traveled north from San Diego to the San Gabriel Valley, Los Angeles Basin, San Fernando Valley, Monterey Bay, and San Francisco Bay. It included what is today the entire Port of Los Angeles; San Pedro, Los Angeles; Harbor City, Los Angeles; Wilmington, Los Angeles; Carson; Compton; the Dominguez Hills; Lomita; the Palos Verdes Peninsula; Redondo Beach; Hermosa Beach; Manhattan Beach; and Torrance.

In 1863, a Scottish immigrant, Sir Robert Burnett, purchased Rancho Sausal Redondo and Rancho Aguaje de la Centinela from Avila's heirs for $33,000. Ten years later in 1873, Burnett leased the ranch to a Canadian, Daniel Freeman (not the American of the same name, who was the first to file a claim under the Homestead Act of 1862). Burnett returned to Scotland. Freeman moved his wife and three children onto the ranch and started growing various crops. On May 4, 1885, Freeman bought the ranch from Burnett for $140,000. At some point after this the location was informally called "Shore Acres." Shortly thereafter, in 1988 the area's first freight and passenger railroad tracks were built by the Santa Fe Railroad company. The tracks ran through Manhattan Beach and spanned all the way to Redondo Beach with a substation constructed in later years at Center Street, which today is Manhattan Beach Boulevard.

George H. Peck owned the land that became part of the north section of Manhattan Beach. A coin flip decided the town's name. Around 1902, the beach suburb was named "Manhattan" after developer Stewart Merrill's home, the New York City borough of Manhattan. "Beach" was appended to the city's name, in 1927, at the behest of the postmaster.

Upon the city's incorporation in 1912, Peck divided out a 2 block area for minority residents on the beachfront. The Bruce family bought some of the area and developed it into the first beach resort for Black Americans in southern California, Bruce’s Beach. In the 1920s, the Ku Klux Klan began violently harassing the resort’s visitors, the Bruce family, and four other Black families that bought lots. In 1924, the city used eminent domain to seize the land from the Black property owners under the pretense of building a park.
In 2021 California Governor Gavin Newsom, ordered by law to begin procedures for immediate restitution of property to descendants of the family.

The land in Manhattan Beach was formerly sand dunes. During the 1920s and 1930s, Kuhn Brothers Construction Company leveled uneven sandy sites and some excess sand was sold and shipped to Waikiki, Hawaii, to convert their reef and rock beach into a sandy beach. The sand was also used to build the Los Angeles Coliseum and portions of the Pacific Coast Highway.

The McMartin preschool trials, allegedly an example of day care sex abuse hysteria, started with investigations of a Manhattan Beach preschool in 1983.  The trials ran from 1987 to 1990 and resulted in no convictions.  HBO dramatized this case in the Emmy-winning Indictment: The McMartin Trial, which was partially filmed in Manhattan Beach.

The Manhattan Beach Historical Society is now in charge of preserving the history of the city.

Geography

Climate

Manhattan Beach benefits from ocean breezes that provide clean air and summer temperatures that are  cooler than the inland regions of Southern California.

Manhattan Beach features  of ocean frontage.

Beach and sand dunes
Manhattan Beach is a prominent area for beach volleyball and surfing.

A majority of the land in Manhattan Beach was once exposed sand dunes, which now lie beneath the city's buildings and streets. The underlying dunes afford residents ocean views throughout western portions of the city. The tallest hill is 244 feet high, and it is located in the city's southwest region. The only remaining exposed sand dune is at Sand Dune Park, where sand resembling the original landscape can also be found. In the late 1920s, excess sand from Manhattan Beach was purchased by Hawaiian developers, who negotiated a deal with the Kuhn Brothers Construction Company to ship the sand across the Pacific Ocean from Manhattan Beach via Los Angeles Harbor to Waikiki Beach over a ten-year period.

The beach is approximately 2.1 miles long and 400 feet wide. In the early part of the last century, the beach was narrow (approximately 150 feet) and sloping. From 1938 to 1989, it more than doubled in width when large quantities of sand were placed on beaches to the north during construction of the Hyperion Treatment Plant, Marina del Rey, and Scattergood Power Plant. The sand was carried southward by the ocean's natural littoral flow and widened Manhattan Beach.

Every August, the city hosts the Manhattan Beach Open Volleyball Tournament and the International Surf Festival.

Neighborhoods

The city has several distinct neighborhoods, including the "Strand", "Sand Section", "Hill Section", "Tree Section", "Gas Lamp Section", "Manhattan Village", "Manhattan Heights", "East Manhattan Beach" (Manhattan Village, Manhattan Heights, Liberty Village), The Poet's Section" (Shelley, Tennyson, Longfellow, Keats), and "El Porto" (North Manhattan Beach). The Roth Tract, between Herrin and Peck, is sometimes referred to as the "Bird Section."

The "Hill Section" is known for its high-priced homes; many of the residences are remodeled or newly constructed. The steep hills allow panoramic ocean and city views.

The "Sand Section" has quiet walk-street neighborhoods adjacent to the ocean. Oceanfront homes stretch along the bike path and walking lane of "The Strand". "The Strand" section of Manhattan Beach includes some of the most expensive real estate per square foot in the United States.

Since 2010, new property developments in Manhattan Beach cannot exceed two lot parcels. Size and appearance restrictions were enacted by the Manhattan Beach City Council to preserve the appearance of the beachfront community after three lots were joined to create a  oceanside home in 2008.

Downtown
"Downtown" Manhattan Beach is considered the heart of the city. The area runs along Manhattan Beach Boulevard and the streets perpendicular to the Manhattan Beach Pier and Valley Drive. There are Zagat-rated casual fine-dining restaurants, specialty boutiques and retailers that create a pedestrian-friendly, mixed-use downtown center.  The Metlox site, where the pottery factory once stood for decades, was closed in the early 1990s and redeveloped into a mixed-use center. The Metlox site includes a luxury boutique hotel, spa, restaurants, shops and underground parking.

North Manhattan Beach District
North Manhattan Beach business district is located near the intersection of Rosecrans and Highland and has restaurants and shops. The district is defined as covering "32nd Street to 45th Street and consist[s] of over 80 businesses".

Rosecrans Corridor
The Rosecrans corridor is located on the south side of Rosecrans Avenue, east of Sepulveda, and west of Aviation.

The Manhattan Beach Country Club, the westdrift Manhattan Beach Hotel and Golf Course, retail stores, restaurants, supermarkets, multi-story office buildings, and shopping centers border the Rosecrans corridor between Sepulveda and Aviation Boulevards. The Rosecrans corridor is adjacent to The Point and Plaza El Segundo off Sepulveda Blvd, which features additional retailers, including Whole Foods Market.

Sepulveda Corridor
The Sepulveda Corridor occupies the commercial zone, and is the city's main north–south highway. The area includes the Manhattan Village Mall, which is located east of Sepulveda Boulevard between Marine and Rosecrans Avenues. The mall, built in the early 1980s, was remodeled in the late 1990s and early 2000s. The mall is anchored by Macy's on both ends and tenants include Pottery Barn, Pottery Barn Kids, Williams Sonoma, and the Apple Store. Many restaurants such as Islands, Chili's, Olive Garden, and the Tin Roof are co-located with the mall. The Manhattan Village Mall is executing a multimillion-dollar redevelopment which adds both outdoor and enclosed retail and restaurant space. There are several medium-size hotels, large automobile dealerships, automotive repair shops, restaurants, multi-story office buildings, medical buildings, pharmacies, banks, small shopping centers and a Target store along this corridor. Kaiser Permanente's medical offices include a laboratory and pharmacy.

Aviation Corridor
The Aviation Corridor is located along Aviation Boulevard (the city's eastern boundary), south of Rosecrans Avenue, and north of Marine Avenue. Aviation High School was located at the intersection of Manhattan Beach Blvd. and Aviation until it closed in the early 1980s. The zone includes several major entertainment and aerospace complexes, including Manhattan Beach Studios and the Northrop Grumman Space Park Complex. Manhattan Beach Media Campus has production for movies and entertainment including the Marvel motion pictures Thor and Iron Man 2 and both sequels to James Cameron's Avatar movie. The studio complex has large photovoltaic solar panel rooftop installations in the area which generates approximately 1 megawatt of power.

Demographics

The 2010 United States Census reported that Manhattan Beach had a population of 35,135. The racial makeup of Manhattan Beach was 29,686 (84.5%) White (79.3% Non-Hispanic White), 290 (0.8%) Black or African American (U.S. Census), 59 (0.2%) Native American, 3,023 (8.6%) Asian, 49 (0.1%) Pacific Islander, 409 (1.2%) from other races, and 1,619 (4.6%) from two or more races. Hispanic or Latino of any race were 2,440 persons (6.9%).

The Census reported that 35,107 people (99.9% of the population) lived in households, 28 (0.1%) lived in non-institutionalized group quarters, and 0 (0%) were institutionalized.

There were 14,038 households, out of which 4,735 (33.7%) had children under the age of 18 living in them, 7,583 (54.0%) were opposite-sex married couples living together, 892 (6.4%) had a female householder with no husband present, 438 (3.1%) had a male householder with no wife present. There were 695 (5.0%) unmarried opposite-sex partnerships, and 85 (0.6%) same-sex married couples or partnerships. 3,627 households (25.8%) were made up of individuals, and 1,078 (7.7%) had someone living alone who was 65 years of age or older. The average household size was 2.50. There were 8,913 families (63.5% of all households); the average family size was 3.10.

The population was spread out, with 8,725 people (24.8%) under the age of 18, 1,740 people (5.0%) aged 18 to 24, 9,532 people (27.1%) aged 25 to 44, 10,681 people (30.4%) aged 45 to 64, and 4,457 people (12.7%) who were 65 years of age or older. The median age was 40.9 years. For every 100 females, there were 100.4 males. For every 100 females age 18 and over, there were 99.2 males. The homeowner vacancy rate was 0.8%; the rental vacancy rate was 5.3%. 25,587 people (72.8% of the population) lived in owner-occupied housing units and 9,520 people (27.1%) lived in rental housing units.

According to the 2010 United States Census, Manhattan Beach had a median household income of $139,259, with 3.4% of the population living below the federal poverty line.

Many high-profile individuals in the sports and entertainment industry live in Manhattan Beach due to its oceanfront desirability, top performing school district, and commuting distance to Los Angeles.

Economy
According to the City's 2010 Comprehensive Annual Financial Report, the top employers in the city are:

Residential prices in Manhattan Beach are among the highest in the state of California. In 2013, the Dataquick study reported that more homes exceeding $1 million were sold in Manhattan Beach than any other city in California. Pacific Palisades, Beverly Hills, La Jolla, Malibu, Bel-Air, Orinda, Atherton, Montecito, and other high end cities in California ranked behind Manhattan Beach. The Higley 100 Census survey found that The Hill Section of Manhattan Beach is the second highest mean household income neighborhood in Los Angeles County, with Beverly Park ranking first and Beverly Hills (the 90210 section) ranking third, respectively. The current median residential home price is $2.2 million according to a November 23, 2014, Los Angeles Times article, and land values in Manhattan Beach rank among the highest per square foot in the nation. Land values on the Manhattan Beach "Strand" are routinely around $10 million for a  piece of land.

Parks and recreation

The wide sandy beaches attract over 3.8 million visitors annually. Beach volleyball, swimming, body boarding and surfing are popular activities among residents and visitors. Popular surf spots include the pier and El Porto, the northern end of the beach. Lifeguard stations are located along the entire length of the beach and the beach is cleaned and groomed daily by crews from LA County Beaches and Harbors Department. Along the Strand at the eastern edge of the beach, a concrete bike path is reserved for bicycles. The bikeway extends north to Santa Monica and south to Torrance. A separate  walkway, reserved for pedestrians, runs alongside the bike path. Restrooms and shower facilities are provided adjacent to the Strand paths. An area known Veteran's Parkway is a pedestrian walkway that runs adjacent to Valley Drive and Ardmore Avenue near downtown Manhattan Beach.

There are several public parks in the city. The largest and most popular is Polliwog Park located on Manhattan Beach Boulevard, two blocks west of Aviation Boulevard. Polliwog Park includes the Manhattan Beach Botanical Garden, as well as a small lake, open-air concert amphitheater, playground equipment, picnic tables, restrooms, and a fenced dog exercise area. It is also the site of the Manhattan Beach Historical Society Red Cottage, which is home to the city's collection of historical artifacts. Marine Avenue Park, west of Aviation Boulevard on Marine, has several lighted ball fields, basketball courts, and an indoor racket ball facility.  A small skate park was added to Marine Avenue Park in 2017 after a 16-year battle over its location. Live Oak Park in the downtown area has ball fields, batting cages, playground equipment, basketball courts, tennis courts, and picnic tables. Additionally, Begg pool offers comprehensive swimming programs year around for both adults and children including instruction, recreational swimming, water aerobics, and even a youth swim team and adult swim club.  Bruce's Beach (formerly Culiacan Park) is north of downtown.

For over 50 years, the city of Manhattan Beach hosts an annual Hometown Fair at Live Oak Park in downtown Manhattan Beach. Popular among community residents, the fair features food and drink, live music, games and booths to raise funds for local causes.

Government

Local government
The city of Manhattan Beach is governed by a five-member City Council. City Council members are elected every four years. The office of the Mayor of Manhattan Beach rotates every nine months among the members of the City Council, so that each City Council member serves one term as Mayor.  A City Manager is appointed by the City Council. An elected City Treasurer serves a four-year term.

The Beach Cities Health District, provides health and wellness services to the residents of Hermosa Beach, Manhattan Beach, and Redondo Beach. It is funded partially by over $3 million annually from property taxes. The voters of the three beach cities elect the 5-member Board of Directors to 4-year terms. One of 78 California Health Districts, it was created in 1955 as South Bay Hospital which no longer exists and took on its current name in 1993. Beach Cities Health District is now focused on real estate development and opened AdventurePlex, a Manhattan Beach fitness center for kids and their families, in 2002. Filled with mazes, tunnels, outdoor rock climbing walls, complex ropes courses, and an indoor gym, AdventurePlex challenges children physically and intellectually in health-focused recreational activities.

County government
Manhattan Beach is in the Second Supervisorial District of Los Angeles County. Holly Mitchell is the District Supervisor. The county collects taxes on properties in Manhattan Beach and maintains property assessment rolls. Los Angeles County maintains the beach and provides daily cleaning and grooming. The county also maintains the bike path at the eastern edge of the beach.
The Manhattan Beach County Library is located downtown on Highland Avenue two blocks north of Manhattan Beach Boulevard. The library is part of the County of Los Angeles Public Library system, and includes Internet-accessible computers, WiFi, and access to the six million items in the county library collection. The new $19 million, 20,000 square foot, two-story facility featuring a glass exterior was completed in 2015.

State legislators

Federal government

Education
According to US Census data, Manhattan Beach holds the ranking as the second most educated city in Los Angeles County and the fifth most educated city in the state of California.

Primary and secondary schools

Public education in Manhattan Beach is provided by the Manhattan Beach Unified School District, which oversees five elementary schools (Grand View, Meadows, Pacific, Pennekamp, Robinson), one middle school (Manhattan Beach Middle School), and one high school (Mira Costa High School).

The Manhattan Beach Unified School district is ranked as the third-best-performing school district in the state of California. The district received a score of 926 on the 2010 California Academic Performance Index. Each individual school also ranks at the top of its respective category.
Manhattan Beach is currently ranked as one of the best suburbs in Los Angeles Country for its high-earning and well educated residents.

Manhattan Beach's top performing school district is currently ranked as the third best in the state of California, behind only Palo Alto and South Pasadena.  and Forbes Magazine ranked the city's school district, MBUSD, as the sixth best school district in the United States.

Private schools located in Manhattan Beach include American Martyrs Catholic School (of the Roman Catholic Archdiocese of Los Angeles), Manhattan Academy, Montessori School of Manhattan Beach and Journey of Faith Christian School.

Residents of Manhattan Beach were in the Wiseburn School District until 1913, when the Manhattan Beach elementary school district formed. Residents attended Redondo Union High School until 1950, when Mira Costa High School opened. Residents were within, in addition to the elementary district, the South Bay Union High School District until 1993, when the latter dissolved. MBUSD formed in 1993.

Media
Manhattan Beach is served by Easy Reader-Manhattan Beach, Beach Magazine, the Daily Breeze, the Los Angeles Times, and the Beach Reporter.

In popular culture

Filming locations
1408 (2007) John Cusack's character surfs in El Porto waves.
2012 (2009) Cracks appear down the middle of 45th Street.
The 1983 Taylor Hackford film Against All Odds was filmed along The Strand and on the beach.
George Jung of Blow (2001) film.
The CBS series CSI: Miami, at Manhattan Beach Studios and one episode was taken at Pollywog Park.
The TV show Hannah Montana used Mira Costa High School as the image of the school portrayed in the TV show, and the Manhattan Beach Pier was also commonly shown in the intro of the show.
Indictment: The McMartin Trial (1995)  Closing scene filmed on Manhattan Beach Pier.
Jerry Maguire (1996) In the movie, Dorothy's (Renée Zellweger) house is in the Gas Lamp Section on 23rd Street.
The Fox Network series The O.C.
The scenes set inside Governor Swan's mansion in Pirates of the Caribbean: Curse of the Black Pearl were shot here.
Point Break (1991) In the movie, Keanu Reeves buys his surfboard from a shop located on the Manhattan Beach pier.
Starsky and Hutch (2004) In the movie, Starsky (Ben Stiller), can be seen stretching under the pier.
Tequila Sunrise (1988) Mel Gibson's character lives on the beach near the pier.
The CW Television Network series Veronica Mars.
The TV show Weeds.
The movie Airborne.
The video for the song "White Walls" by Macklemore.
The movie Mac & Devin Go to High School and scenes from the music video "Young, Wild & Free" by Snoop Dogg and Wiz Khalifa.

Other
Manhattan Beach is mentioned in the song "Surfin' U.S.A." by the Beach Boys. Group members were from the adjacent city of Hawthorne.
The Manhattan Beach Open volleyball tournament in Manhattan Beach is known as "The Championships, Wimbledon of Beach Volleyball." The names of the tournament champions are inscribed in plaques along Manhattan Beach Pier. This event usually takes place in August and airs on national TV.

Notable people
See: List of people from Manhattan Beach, California

Public transportation
Manhattan Beach is served by Beach Cities Transit.  The Douglas and Redondo Beach C Line stations are nearby, though outside the city.

Historically, Manhattan Beach was served by the Pacific Electric streetcar system.

See also

References

External links

Manhattan Beach Historical Society
Leadership Manhattan Beach
Manhattan Beach Chamber of Commerce

 
1912 establishments in California
Cities in Los Angeles County, California
Incorporated cities and towns in California
Populated coastal places in California
Populated places established in 1912
South Bay, Los Angeles